Andrena pilipes is a Palearctic species of mining bee.

References

External links
Images representing Andrena pilipes 

Hymenoptera of Europe
pilipes s.s.
Insects described in 1781